Pedro is an unincorporated community in central Elizabeth Township, Lawrence County, Ohio, United States.  It has a post office with ZIP code 45659.

Public services
The residents of Pedro are served by the Rock Hill Local School District and the Briggs Lawrence County Public Library in Ironton, with branches in South Point, Chesapeake, Proctorville, and Willow Wood. There is also a pay lake on the left side of State Route 93.

References

External links
Briggs Lawrence County Public Library
 Rock Hill Local School District

Unincorporated communities in Lawrence County, Ohio
Unincorporated communities in Ohio